Youngest in Charge is the debut studio album from then 17-year-old hip hop artist Special Ed from Brooklyn. It was released in 1989 through Profile Records. Recording sessions took place at Howie's Crib and at Q's House in New York. Production was handled solely by Howie Tee. It peaked at number 73 on the Billboard 200 albums chart in the United States.

In 1998, the album was selected as one of The Sources 100 Best Rap Albums Ever.

Track listing

Charts

References

External links

1989 debut albums
Special Ed albums
Profile Records albums
Albums produced by Howie Tee